Raf-like Ras-binding domain is an evolutionary conserved protein domain. This is the Ras-binding domain found in proteins related to Ras.

Examples 
Human proteins containing this domain include:
 ARAF
 BRAF
 RAF1
 RGS12, RGS14
 TIAM1

References 
 

Protein domains